The spoon-billed sandpiper (Calidris pygmaea) is a small wader which breeds on the coasts of the Bering Sea and winters in Southeast Asia. This species is highly threatened, and it is said that since the 1970s the breeding population has decreased significantly. By 2000, the estimated breeding population of the species was 350–500.

Taxonomy 
Platalea pygmea was the scientific name proposed by Carl Linnaeus in 1758. It was moved to Eurynorhynchus by Sven Nilsson in 1821. It is now classified under the calidrid sandpipers.

Description 

The most distinctive feature of this species is its spatulate bill. The breeding adult bird is 14–16 cm in length, and has a red-brown head, neck and breast with dark brown streaks. It has blackish upperparts with buff and pale rufous fringing. Non-breeding adults lack the reddish colouration, but have pale brownish-grey upperparts with whitish fringing to the wing-coverts. The underparts are white and the legs are black.

The measurements are; wing 98–106 mm, bill 19–24 mm, bill tip breadth 10–12 mm, tarsus 19–22 mm and tail 37–39 mm.

The contact calls of the spoon-billed sandpiper include a quiet  or a shrill . The song, given during display, is an intermittent buzzing and descending trill . The display flight of the male includes brief hovers, circling and rapid diving while singing.

Distribution and habitat 

The spoon-billed sandpiper's breeding habitat is sea coasts and adjacent hinterland on the Chukchi Peninsula and southwards along the isthmus of the Kamchatka Peninsula. It migrates down the Pacific coast through Japan, Korea and China, to its main wintering grounds in south and southeast Asia, where it has been recorded from India, Bangladesh, Sri Lanka, Burma, Thailand, Vietnam, the Philippines, Peninsular Malaysia and Singapore.

Through phylogenetic analyses for the complete mitogenome sequence, South Korean and Chinese C. pygmaea groups were indicated to be closely related to Arenaria interpres because of the similarity in the series of protein-coding genes.

Behaviour and ecology 
Its feeding style consists of a side-to-side movement of the bill as the bird walks forward with its head down. This species nests in June–July on coastal areas in the tundra, choosing locations with grass close to freshwater pools. Spoon-billed sandpipers feed on the moss in tundras, as well as smaller animal species like mosquitoes, flies, beetles, and spiders. At certain points in time, they also feed on marine vertebrates such as shrimp and worms.

Conservation 
This bird is critically endangered, with a current population of fewer than 2500 – probably fewer than 1000 – mature individuals. The main threats to its survival are habitat loss on its breeding grounds and loss of tidal flats through its migratory and wintering range. The important staging area at Saemangeum, South Korea,  has already been partially reclaimed, and the remaining wetlands are under serious threat of reclamation in the near future. Long-term remote sensing studies have shown that up to 65% of key spoon-billed sandpiper habitat in China, South Korea and North Korea has been destroyed by reclamation. A 2010 study suggests that hunting in Burma by traditional bird trappers is a primary cause of the decline.

Protected areas in its staging and wintering areas include Yancheng in China, Mai Po Marshes in Hong Kong and Point Calimere and Chilka lake in India. As of 2016, the global spoon-billed sandpiper population was estimated at 240–456 mature individuals or at maximum 228 pairs.

Formerly classified as an Endangered species by the IUCN, recent research shows that its numbers are decreasing more and more rapidly and that it is on the verge of extinction. It is consequently reclassified to Critically Endangered status in 2008. The population was estimated at only 120–200 pairs in 2009–2010, perhaps indicating an 88% decline since 2002 equating to an annual rate of decline of 26%. Draining of the Saemangeum estuary in South Korea removed an important migration staging point, and hunting on the important wintering grounds in Burma has emerged as a serious threat. This species may become extinct in 10–20 years.<ref name= BB2010> The hunting in Burma and extinction prediction reported in BB was based on Wader Study Group Bulletin 117 (2010)</ref>

In November 2011, thirteen spoon-billed sandpipers arrived at the Wildfowl and Wetlands Trust (WWT) reserve in Slimbridge, Gloucestershire, United Kingdom to start a breeding programme. The birds hatched from eggs collected in remote northeastern Russian tundra earlier and spent 60 days in Moscow Zoo in quarantine in preparation for the 8,000 km journey. Artificial incubation and captive rearing, termed headstarting, were expected to increase survival rates from less than 25% to over 75%, and the removal of eggs was expected to lead to a second clutch reared by the parents.
In 2019, almost a decade since the rescue mission, the two birds were first to be born in a UK spoon-billed sandpiper ark. In 2013, conservationists hatched twenty chicks in Chukotka.

The Photo Ark
In July 2022, National Geographic announced that the spoon-billed sandpiper was the milestone 13,000th animal photographed for The Photo Ark''.

References

External links 

 Video of a displaying male at YouTube
 BBC – Bid to save sandpiper at risk of extinction
 Saving the spoon-billed sandpiper, Chukotka expedition 2011 
 Video of chicks at Slimbridge WWT. July 2012. guardian.co.uk
 The spoon-billed sandpiper conservation breeding programme
 Spoon-billed sandpiper page at East Asian – Australasian Flyway Partnership

spoon-billed sandpiper
Birds of North Asia
spoon-billed sandpiper
Taxa named by Carl Linnaeus